The Clyde Farm Site (7NC-E-6) is a prehistoric archaeological site in rural New Castle County, Delaware, United States.  Its main features are remnants of a pit-house, storage area, and hearth, dating to c. 1000 BCE.  Another area where stone tools were produced was also identified during excavations in 1984.  The site has been known, and the subject of both amateur and professional archaeological interest, since at least the 1930s.  It is described as being located near the fall line of a waterway and also an estuarine area.

The site was listed on the National Register of Historic Places in 1977.

See also
National Register of Historic Places listings in northern New Castle County, Delaware

References

Archaeological sites on the National Register of Historic Places in Delaware
New Castle County, Delaware
National Register of Historic Places in New Castle County, Delaware